Firinghi Kalibari is a temple dedicated to the Hindu Goddess Kali located on B.B. Ganguly Street in Bowbazar locality of Kolkata, West Bengal, India. The temple is said to be over 200 years old and is named after its association with [[Anthony Firingee](1786-1839)], a European who converted to Hinduism and was a great devotee of Kali.

See also
Anthony Firingee

References

Hindu temples in Kolkata